Çağrı is a unisex Turkish given name. In Turkish, "Çağrı" means "The Call", "Appellation", and/or "Distinction". It also means "Falcon". Notable people with the name include:

Given name
 Çağrı Bey (989–1060), Seljuq ruler
 Çağrı Coşkun (born 1984), Turkish motorcycle racer
 Çağrı Şensoy (born 1986), Turkish actor

Surname
 Mahir Çağrı (born 1962), Turkish internet celebrity

Turkish-language surnames
Turkish unisex given names